Sayre may refer to

People
Anne Sayre (1923–1998), American writer well known for her biography of Rosalind Franklin
Anthony D. Sayre (1858-1931), Alabama jurist
David Austin Sayre (1793-1870), American silversmith, banker, and educator
David F. Sayre (1822-1919), American politician, farmer, and lawyer
Francis Bowes Sayre, Sr. (1885-1972), American ambassador and son-in-law of President Woodrow Wilson
Francis Bowes Sayre, Jr. (1915-2008), American Episcopal cleric and Dean of Washington Cathedral
Geneva Sayre (1911–1992), American bryologist
Geoffrey Sayre-McCord (born 1956), American philosopher 
James Willis Sayre (1877-1963), American theatre critic
Joel Sayre (1900-1979) American novelist
John Nevin Sayre (1884 - 1977), American pastor and magazine editor; brother of Francis Bowes Sayre, Sr.
Kenneth M. Sayre (1928-2022), American philosopher
Lewis Albert Sayre (1820-1900), American orthopedic surgeon
Nora Sayre (1932-2001), American film critic
Reginald Sayre (1859-1929) American orthopedic surgeon and Olympic shooter
Robert H. Sayre (1824-1907), American businessman
Stephen Sayre (1736-1818), American revolutionary who allegedly planned to kidnap George III
Zelda Sayre (1900-1948), American novelist, daughter of the jurist, and wife of writer F. Scott Fitzgerald

Places
 Sayre, Alabama, an unincorporated community in Jefferson County, Alabama, United States
 Sayre, Oklahoma, a city in Beckham County, Oklahoma, United States
 Sayre, Pennsylvania, a borough in Bradford County, Pennsylvania, United States
 Sayreville, New Jersey, a borough in Middlesex, New Jersey, United States

See also
 Sayre Fire, a wildfire that burned near northern Los Angeles, California, United States, in 2008